She Done Him Right may refer to:
 She Done Him Right (1933 film), a short animated cartoon
 She Done Him Right (1940 film), an American comedy film